Ooky Spooky is the fifth studio album by Cuban American dark cabaret/Dark Wave singer Voltaire. It was released on July 31, 2007 by Projekt Records, being the last Voltaire album to do so, since his contract with Projekt Records expired. Voltaire has stated that he wanted this album to be more fun and silly, as opposed to his more serious albums, Almost Human (2000) and Boo-Hoo (2002).

Voltaire worked with Amanda Palmer of The Dresden Dolls on the song "Stuck with You", which is about an unhappily married couple who cannot divorce because of their religion.

Live versions of the songs "Cantina", "Zombie Prostitute..." and "Hell in a Handbasket" have already been released on Live!. A live version of "Hell in a Handbasket" also appeared on Zombie Prostitute..., as did the track "Zombie Prostitute...", and a demo of "Cantina". Also appearing on the Maxi-CD was the Spanish version of the song "Day of the Dead". The album is available on iTunes.

"Land of the Dead" was originally written for The Grim Adventures of Billy & Mandy direct-to-TV film Billy & Mandy's Big Boogey Adventure. Voltaire previously worked for The Grim Adventures of Billy & Mandy with the song "BRAINS!", in the episode "Little Rock of Horrors".

The cover features Voltaire in a black and purple sombrero with a silver bottom holding a skeleton. The O's in the title are replaced by skulls

Track listing

Sources

Voltaire (musician) albums
Projekt Records albums
Ska albums by American artists
2007 albums